Frank Sullivan (born June 3, 1951) is an American former college men's basketball coach, currently serving as an Associate Commissioner at the America East Conference. The Lexington, Massachusetts native served as head coach at Bentley University from 1984 to 1991 and Harvard University from 1991 to 2007. He guided the Harvard Crimson to a 178–245 record over 16 seasons, never finishing higher than second in Ivy league play. On March 5, 2007, it was announced that he would not be returning as the coach of the Harvard Crimson for the 2007–2008 season. Sullivan is responsible for recruiting Houston Rockets point guard Jeremy Lin.

Sullivan amassed a record of 114–86 at Bentley University in seven seasons. Prior to his time at Bentley, he held assistant coaching roles at Villanova, Lehigh and Seton Hall. He played college basketball at Westfield State University.

References

1951 births
Living people
American men's basketball players
Basketball coaches from Massachusetts
Basketball players from Massachusetts
Bentley Falcons men's basketball coaches
College men's basketball head coaches in the United States
Harvard Crimson men's basketball coaches
Lehigh Mountain Hawks men's basketball coaches
People from Lexington, Massachusetts
Seton Hall Pirates men's basketball coaches
Sportspeople from Middlesex County, Massachusetts
Villanova University alumni
Villanova Wildcats men's basketball coaches
Westfield State Owls men's basketball players